Angela Lynch-Lupton (died 2007) served as Mayor of Galway for two terms in 1989 and 1998.  She was the eighty-fourth bearer of the name to serve in that office since Peirce Lynch, elected as the first Mayor, in August 1485.

Lynch served two terms as a Fine Gael councillor for the city's west ward. She also ran for the European Parliament in 1989 but won only 3.25% of the vote. She retired in 2004 due to health reasons, and died in 2007.

Sources
 Henry, William (2002). Role of Honour: The Mayors of Galway City 1485-2001. Galway: Galway City Council.  

Year of birth missing
2007 deaths
Fine Gael politicians
Mayors of Galway
Politicians from County Galway
Women mayors of places in Ireland